Ljiljana Buttler (née Petrović; 14 December 1944 – 26 April 2010) was a Yugoslav-Romani folk singer comparable to Esma Redžepova, Vida Pavlović, and Šaban Bajramović.

Early life
Buttler was born as Ljiljana Petrović on 14 December 1944 in Belgrade, Kingdom of Yugoslavia during World War II. Her father was a Romani accordionist from Serbia, while her mother was Ljiljana Petrović, a Croatian singer from Zagreb. Her father left the family shortly after the birth of his daughter. Petrović moved to the city of Bijeljina, Bosnia and Herzegovina, where her mother performed in pubs. As a teenager she began singing, she returned to Belgrade where she settled in the Skadarlija bohemian quarter.

Career
Her debut album was recorded in 1982, and her popularity rose in that decade. During the Yugoslav civil war in the 1990s, she emigrated to Düsseldorf, Germany, married and took her husband's name. In 2002, Dragi Šestić pursued her to come back and record an album. Her last album was released in 2009. She died of cancer in 2010, aged 65.

Discography
 Ljiljana Petrović: «Djelem, Djelem Daje» with Ansambl Zorana Pejkoviča (1981) RTV Ljubljana LD 0720
 Ljiljana Petrović: «Pevam Do Zore - Zabavljam Druge» with Orkestar Dragana Kneževica (1983) RTV Ljubljana LD 0868
 Ljiljana Petrović: (self-titled) with Orkestar Dušana Mitrovica-Nivoda (1984) RTV Ljubljana LD 1242
 Ljiljana Buttler & Mostar Sevdah Reunion: «The Mother of Gypsy Soul» (2002) Snail Records
 Ljiljana Buttler & Mostar Sevdah Reunion: «The Legends of Life» (2005) Snail Records
 Ljiljana Buttler: «Frozen Roses» (2009) Snail Records

External links
 Obituary in The Guardian
 Snail Records - The Official record label
 Ljiljana Buttler -My Space page

1944 births
2010 deaths
Balkan music
Romani musicians
Singers from Belgrade
Musicians from Düsseldorf
Deaths from cancer in Germany
Yugoslav emigrants to Germany